Hennie Binneman (30 April 1914 – 19 March 1968) was a South African cyclist. He competed in the individual road race event at the 1936 Summer Olympics.

References

External links
 

1914 births
1968 deaths
Afrikaner people
South African male cyclists
Olympic cyclists of South Africa
Cyclists at the 1936 Summer Olympics
People from Bellville, South Africa
Commonwealth Games medallists in cycling
Commonwealth Games gold medallists for South Africa
Cyclists at the 1938 British Empire Games
Sportspeople from the Western Cape
20th-century South African people
Medallists at the 1938 British Empire Games